Kortezubi is a town and municipality located in the province of Biscay, in the Basque Autonomous Community, northern Spain. It has 412 inhabitants.

References

External links
 KORTEZUBI in the Bernardo Estornés Lasa - Auñamendi Encyclopedia (Euskomedia Fundazioa) 

Municipalities in Biscay